Events from the year 1842 in China.

Incumbents 
 Daoguang Emperor (22nd year)

Viceroys
 Viceroy of Zhili — Nergingge
 Viceroy of Min-Zhe — 
 Viceroy of Huguang — 
 Viceroy of Shaan-Gan — ?
 Viceroy of Liangguang — 
 Viceroy of Yun-Gui — 
 Viceroy of Sichuan — 
 Viceroy of Liangjiang —

Events

Ongoing
 First Opium War
 February 1842 — the Nemesis saw action at Taisam in, in a successful skirmish associated with repulse of a much larger Chinese attack on Ningbo.
 In the spring of 1842 the Daoguang Emperor ordered his cousin Yijing to retake the city of Ningpo. In the ensuing Battle of Ningpo on 10 March the British garrison repelled the assault with rifle fire and naval artillery. At Ningpo the British lured the Qing army into the city streets before opening fire, resulting in heavy Chinese casualties. 
 15 March — The British pursued the retreating Chinese army, capturing the nearby city of Cixi
 29 August — The First Opium war officially ends with the signing of the Treaty of Nanking.

Births 
 Wu Tingfang (Chinese: 伍廷芳, also known as Ng Choy or Ng Achoy[1] (Chinese: 伍才; pinyin: Wǔ Cái); 30 July 1842 – 23 June 1922) was a Straits Settlements-born Chinese diplomat and politician who served as Minister of Foreign Affairs and briefly as Acting Premier during the early years of the Republic of China.

References

 
China